The 2002 Leeward Islands Junior Championships in Athletics took place on June 1–2, 2002.  The event was held at the A. O. Shirley Recreation Ground in Road Town, Tortola, British Virgin Islands.  A detailed report was published.

A total of 42 events were contested, 22 by boys and 20 by girls.

Medal summary
Medal winners were published.  Complete results can be found on the Nevis Amateur Athletic Association webpage.

Boys (U-20)

†: Open event for both U20 and U17 athletes.

Girls (U-20)

†: Open event for both U20 and U17 athletes.

Boys (U-17)

Girls (U-17)

Medal table (unofficial)

Team trophies
The scores for the team trophy were published.

Participation
According to an unofficial count, 135 athletes from 6 countries participated.

 (15)
 (32)
 (31)
 (37)
 (4)
 (16)

References

2002
Leeward Islands Junior Championships in Athletics
Leeward Islands Junior Championships in Athletics
2002 in youth sport